König Glacier is a glacier,  long and  wide, flowing in a northerly direction from the north side of Neumayer Glacier to the head of Fortuna Bay, South Georgia. It was first surveyed in 1928–29 by a German expedition under Kohl-Larsen, who named it for Austrian mountaineer Felix König, who took part in the Second German Antarctic Expedition, 1911–12, under Wilhelm Filchner.

See also
 List of glaciers in the Antarctic
 Glaciology

References

Glaciers of South Georgia